Orestes Garrison (August 8, 1813 – June 3, 1874) was an American surveyor and politician.

Born in Fort Ann, New York, Garrison was a surveyor for the United States Government and lived in Indiana. In 1843, Garrison, his wife and family moved to McHenry County, Illinois. Then in 1855, they moved to Centralia, Wisconsin (now Wisconsin Rapids, Wisconsin). Garrison was involved in real estate. In 1861, Garrison served in the Wisconsin State Assembly. He died of colon cancer in Centralia, Wisconsin.

Notes

1813 births
1874 deaths
People from McHenry County, Illinois
People from Fort Ann, New York
People from Wisconsin Rapids, Wisconsin
Businesspeople from Wisconsin
American surveyors
Deaths from cancer in Wisconsin
Members of the Wisconsin State Assembly
19th-century American politicians
19th-century American businesspeople